Vriesea longicaulis is a species of flowering plant in the Bromeliaceae family. This bromeliad is endemic to the Atlantic Forest biome (Mata Atlantica Brasileira), located in southeastern Brazil.

References

longicaulis
Endemic flora of Brazil
Flora of the Atlantic Forest
Taxa named by John Gilbert Baker
Taxa named by Carl Christian Mez